Tambja amitina is a species of sea slug, a dorid nudibranch, a marine gastropod mollusk in the family Polyceridae. It is currently considered to be a nomen dubium.

Distribution
This species was originally described from Indonesia.

References

Polyceridae
Gastropods described in 1905
Nomina dubia